Terence Arnold (Terry) Betts (born 15 September 1943 in Harlow, Essex, England) is a former international speedway rider who reached the final of the
Speedway World Championship in 1974. He became World Pairs Champion with Ray Wilson in 1972 and was a member of the Great Britain team that won the World Team Cup in 1972 and 1973.

Career summary
Betts began his career with the Norwich Stars but joined the King's Lynn Stars in 1965 after the closure of Norwich . He remained there for the majority of his career, spending one season with Reading Racers before he retired on the eve of the 1980 season. He was awarded a testimonial meeting in 1975 after ten years of continuous service to the club. Betts was a regular England international.

In 2005, Betts was voted as the greatest King's Lynn Stars rider of all time by the club's fans.

World Final Appearances

Individual World Championship
 1974 -  Göteborg, Ullevi - 12th - 6pts

World Pairs Championship
 1972 -  Borås (with Ray Wilson) - Winner - 24pts (9)

World Team Cup
 1966 -  Wrocław, Olympic Stadium (with Barry Briggs / Nigel Boocock / Ivan Mauger / Colin Pratt) - 4th - 8pts (0)
 1972 -  Olching, Olching Speedwaybahn (with Ivan Mauger / Ray Wilson / John Louis) Winner - 36pts (8)
 1973 -  London, Wembley Stadium (with Malcolm Simmons / Ray Wilson / Peter Collins) – Winner – 37pts (9)

References

Notes

1943 births
Living people
Sportspeople from Harlow
British speedway riders
English motorcycle racers
Speedway World Pairs Champions
King's Lynn Stars riders
Norwich Stars riders
Wolverhampton Wolves riders
Reading Racers riders
Long Eaton Archers riders